The Story of Kullervo is a collection of several texts, including a prose version of the Kullervo cycle in Elias Lönnrot's Karelian and Finnish epic poem Kalevala, written by J. R. R. Tolkien when he was an undergraduate at Exeter College, Oxford, from 1914 to 1915. That was an unsettled period for the author and this is thought to be reflected in the story's dark subject matter. 

It also marks "the first time that J. R. R. Tolkien, who had been a poet until then, began writing prose". Known as a source (among others) for Túrin Turambar, "The Story of Kullervo" was the centre of Tolkien's efforts in 1914, as he was "trying to turn one of the stories [of the Kalevala] — which is really a very great story and most tragic – into a short story" (Letters, October 1914, #1). As well as Tolkien's treatment of the Kullervo cycle, the book also contains three essays: two by Tolkien from the same period and the third by Flieger – the two essays by Tolkien are (as is the story) accompanied by notes and commentary by the editor. 

The first of Tolkien's essays (On The Kalevala or Land of Heroes) was written in 1914 and was delivered as a talk to the Corpus Christi College 'Sundial' club at Oxford in November 1914 and again at the Exeter College Essay Club in February 1915; his second essay (The Kalevala), a revised version of the first, is unfinished and is unknown to have ever been delivered. Verlyn Flieger suggests a date of circa 1919 for the revised essay; she notes but disagrees with Christina Scull & Wayne G. Hammond's estimate of 1921–24.

Book structure 
The main parts of the book are:
 The Story of Kullervo
 Notes and commentary
 On 'The Kalevala' or Land of Heroes
 Notes and commentary
 The Kalevala
 Notes and commentary
 Tolkien, The Kalevala, and 'The Story of Kullervo' by Verlyn Flieger

History of publication 
The Story of Kullervo was edited by Verlyn Flieger, published in 2010 in Tolkien Studies, and republished in book form in August 2015 by HarperCollins.

Reception 
Elizabeth Graham in a review for NPR wrote that "this folk tale is not a nice one. Newcomers to Tolkien may find it a somewhat rough ride, but Tolkien geeks will find plenty to geek out about."

Those expecting a typical Tolkien story will be unsettled by Kullervo: He is physically ugly, angry, destructive and uncontrollable. Raised as a prisoner of his father's murderer, Kullervo survives all attempts to kill him and ruins every task he is given. Sold into slavery and mistreated by his master's wife, Kullervo arranges for her to be eaten alive by wolves and bears. On his way home, he meets a girl and abducts her; they live together for a time, but she drowns herself when they discover they are brother and sister.

Kirkus Reviews called the book "Hobbitmeister Tolkien’s first effort at fantasy, surrounded by scholarly scaffolding." and noted that "serious students of his work and of world folklore will appreciate this more than will general readers."

References
Citations

Works cited

2015 books
Works based on the Kalevala
Poetry by J. R. R. Tolkien
Books published posthumously
HarperCollins books